This chart provides audio examples for phonetic vowel symbols. The symbols shown include those in the International Phonetic Alphabet (IPA) and added material. The chart is based on the official IPA vowel chart.

The International Phonetic Alphabet is an alphabetic system of phonetic notation based primarily on the Latin alphabet. It was devised by the International Phonetic Association as a standardized representation of the sounds of spoken language.

Within the chart “close”, “open”, “mid”, “front”, “central”, and “back” refer to the placement of the sound within the mouth. At points where two sounds share an intersection, the left is unrounded, and the right is rounded which refers to the shape of the lips while making the sound.

See also
 IPA pulmonic consonant chart with audio 
 IPA non-pulmonic consonant chart with audio

References

International Phonetic Alphabet
Vowel letters
Phonetics